Cyanuric triazide (C3N12 or (NCN3)3) is described as an environmentally friendly, low toxicity, and organic primary explosive with a detonation velocity of about 7,300 m s−1, and ignition temperature at 205 °C. Primary research on this compound focuses on its use as a high energy density compound.

Structure 
The cyanuric triazide molecule is planar and has three-fold axis symmetry – a triskelion with molecular point group C3h. The 1,3,5-triazine (or cyanuric) ring consists of alternating carbon and nitrogen atoms with C–N bond lengths of 1.334 to 1.336 Å. The distance from the center of the ring to each ring carbon atom is 1.286 Å, while the corresponding distance to ring nitrogens is 1.379 Å. Azide groups are linked to the carbon atoms on the cyanuric ring by single bonds with an interatomic distance of 1.399 Å.

Occurrence 
This compound is purely synthetic and therefore does not exist in nature.

Synthesis 
Cyanuric triazide can be synthesized via nucleophilic aromatic substitution using cyanuric trichloride with an excess of sodium azide refluxed in acetone solution.  The white crystals can then be purified via crystallization in −20 °C toluene.

Decomposition reactions 
This white polycrystalline solid was found to be stable under standard conditions but is extremely shock sensitive causing it to violently decompose when ground with a mortar.  The thermodynamic properties of cyanuric triazide were studied using bomb calorimetry with a combustion enthalpy (H) of 2234 kJ mol−1 under oxidizing conditions and 740 kJ mol−1 otherwise. The former value is comparable to the military explosive RDX, (C3N3)(NO3)3H6, but is not put into use due to its less than favorable stability. Melting point examination showed a sharp melting range to clear liquid at 94–95 °C, gas evolution at 155 °C, orange to brown solution discoloration at 170 °C, orange-brown solidification at 200 °C and rapid decomposition at 240 °C. The rapid decomposition at 240 °C results from the formation of elemental carbon as graphite and the formation of nitrogen gas.

References 

Explosive chemicals
Triazines
Organoazides